Marivirga tractuosa is a bacterium from the genus of Marivirga which has been isolated from beach sand from the South China Sea in Nhatrang in Vietnam.

References

External links
Marivirga_tractuosa at MicrobeWiki

Further reading

External links
Type strain of Marivirga tractuosa at BacDive -  the Bacterial Diversity Metadatabase

Cytophagia
Bacteria described in 1969